The 2022–23 Canisius Golden Griffins men's basketball team represented Canisius College in the 2022–23 NCAA Division I men's basketball season. The Golden Griffins, led by seventh-year head coach Reggie Witherspoon, played their home games at the Koessler Athletic Center in Buffalo, New York as members of the Metro Atlantic Athletic Conference.

Previous season
The Golden Griffins finished the 2021–22 season 11–21, 7–13 in MAAC play to finish tied for last place. As the No. 10 seed, they were defeated by Fairfield in the first round of the MAAC tournament.

Roster

Schedule and results

|-
!colspan=12 style=| Regular season

|-
!colspan=12 style=| MAAC tournament

Sources

References

Canisius Golden Griffins men's basketball seasons
Canisius Golden Griffins
Canisius Golden Griffins men's basketball
Canisius Golden Griffins men's basketball